Jakson Dale Reetz (born January 3, 1996) is an American professional baseball catcher in the Kansas City Royals organization. He previously played for the Washington Nationals.

Career

Washington Nationals
In high school, Reetz played for the United States national under-18 baseball team. Reetz was selected in the third round of the 2014 Major League Baseball draft out of Norris High School in Firth, Nebraska. He chose to turn pro and signed with the Nationals, who drafted him with the 93rd overall pick. He made his professional debut with the rookie-level GCL Nationals, hitting .274 in 43 games. In 2015, Reetz played for the Low-A Auburn Doubledays, batting .212/.326/.248 in 36 games. The following year, Reetz played in Single-A with the Hagerstown Suns, posting a .230/.346/.357 slash line with 4 home runs and 38 RBI. For the 2017 season, Reetz split the year between Hagerstown and the High-A Potomac Nationals, accumulating a .237/.337/.355 batting line with 4 home runs and 22 RBI. He returned to Potomac in 2018, slashing .224/.342/.323 with 5 home runs and 27 RBI in 69 games. Reetz played for Potomac for a third straight season in 2019, and batted .252/.370/.441 with career-highs in home runs (13) and RBI (55).

After parts of six seasons in the Nationals organization, Reetz was invited to spring training in 2020 with the major league team. Reetz was also part of the team's 60-man player pool during the shortened season that year, but did not play in a game due to the cancellation of the minor league season because of the COVID-19 pandemic. He was subsequently invited to major league spring training in 2021, although he did not make the team.

Reetz was promoted to Triple-A minor league baseball for the first time in July 2021, advancing from the Double-A Harrisburg Senators to the Rochester Red Wings. Days later, on July 10, the Nationals selected his contract and promoted him to the major leagues for the first time, following an injury to primary catcher Yan Gomes. He made his major league debut the same day, doubling off San Francisco Giants reliever John Brebbia in his first career at-bat and scoring a run. Reetz was designated for assignment by the Nationals on September 22.

Milwaukee Brewers
On December 9, 2021, Reetz signed a minor league contract with the Milwaukee Brewers. Reetz was added to the 40-man roster on August 4, 2022, and subsequently designated for assignment on August 18. He cleared waivers and declined an outright assignment, becoming a free agent.

Kansas City Royals
On August 25, 2022, Reetz signed a minor league contract with the Kansas City Royals.  After the season, he was chosen for the Southern League Most Valuable Player Award for his time playing for the Brewers' AA affiliate. He elected free agency on November 10, 2022. He re-signed a minor league deal on December 13, 2022.

References

External links

1996 births
Living people
People from Lancaster County, Nebraska
Baseball players from Nebraska
Major League Baseball catchers
Washington Nationals players
Gulf Coast Nationals players
Auburn Doubledays players
Hagerstown Suns players
Potomac Nationals players
Harrisburg Senators players
Rochester Red Wings players
Surprise Saguaros players
Nashville Sounds players
Biloxi Shuckers players
Omaha Storm Chasers players